Børsa is a former municipality in the old Sør-Trøndelag county, Norway. The  municipality existed from 1838 until its dissolution in 1965. The municipality originally encompassed the coastal areas along the Orkdalsfjorden and the Gaulosen in what is now Skaun and Orkland municipalities. The administrative centre was the village of Børsa where Børsa Church is located.

History
The parish of Børsa was established as a civil municipality on 1 January 1838 (see formannskapsdistrikt). On 1 January 1890, the municipality was divided into two: Børseskognen (population: 1,410) in the south and Børsa (population: 2,300) in the north. On 1 January 1905, the area of northwest of the Orkdalsfjorden (population: 674) was separated to become the new municipality of Geitastrand and the area southeast of the fjord remained as Børsa with a population of 1,420.

During the 1960s, there were many municipal mergers across Norway due to the work of the Schei Committee. On 1 January 1965, the neighboring municipalities of Børsa (population: 1,476), Skaun (population: 1,251), and Buvik (population: 1,267) were merged to form the new, larger municipality of Skaun.

Name
The municipality (originally the parish) is named after local bay that lies along the village of Børsa. The first element is a derivative of the word  which means "cliff" or "rock". The last element is the suffix  which has an uncertain meaning. Historically, the name has been spelled .

Government
During its existence, this municipality was governed by a municipal council of elected representatives, which in turn elected a mayor.

Municipal council
The municipal council  of Børsa was made up of representatives that were elected to four year terms. The party breakdown of the final municipal council was as follows:

Mayors
The mayors of Børsa:

 1838–1839: Fredrik Christian Mosling
 1840–1845: Anders Nilsen Liaklev
 1846–1847: Erik Arntsen Einum
 1848–1861: Henning Junghaus Kaurin
 1862–1871: Erik Arntsen Einum
 1872–1875: Ole Larsen Handberg
 1876–1879: Erik Arntsen Einum (V)
 1880–1881: Christian Høy Müller (H)
 1882–1898: Enoch Wiggen (H)
 1899–1904: Knud Moe (H)
 1905–1922: Martin Handberg (H)
 1923–1925: Peder Viggen (V)
 1926–1928: Sivert Kufaas (V)
 1929–1931: John J. Wiggen (Bp)
 1932–1934: Ingebrigt Wiggen (Bp)
 1935–1941: Peter Kjærem (Bp)
 1941–1945: Ole Espås (NS)
 1945-1945: Peter Kjærem (Bp)
 1946–1951: Martinus Haugum (Bp)
 1952–1964: Anders Høiseth (Bp)

See also
List of former municipalities of Norway

References

Skaun
Orkland
Former municipalities of Norway
1838 establishments in Norway
1965 disestablishments in Norway